The 2nd constituency of the Orne (French: Troisième circonscription de l'Orne) is a French legislative constituency in the Orne département. Like the other 576 French constituencies, it elects one MP using a two round electoral system.

Description
The 2nd Constituency of the Orne covers the north western portion of the department including the town of Argentan.

Historically the seat has lent towards the right, electing left wing candidates in only 1988 and 2012. Longstanding deputy Hubert Bassot died whilst in office in 1995, his widow Sylvia Bassot subsequently also held the seat.

Assembly Members

Election results

2022

 
 
 
 
 
 
 
|-
| colspan="8" bgcolor="#E9E9E9"|
|-

2017

 
 
 
 
 
 
|-
| colspan="8" bgcolor="#E9E9E9"|
|-

2012

References

3